The Liar and His Lover is a South Korean television series starring Lee Hyun-woo and Park Soo-young with Lee Jung-jin, Lee Seo-won and Hong Seo-young. The drama is based on the popular Japanese manga Kanojo wa Uso o Aishisugiteru by Kotomi Aoki. It aired on tvN every Monday and Tuesday at 23:00 (KST) starting from March 20, 2017. The series was also released internationally on Netflix starting from October 1, 2019.

Synopsis 
A love story about a heartbroken genius music composer Kang Han-gyul (Lee Hyun-woo) who meets the talented singer and student Yoon So-rim (Joy) whilst he's living under a hidden identity. With her courageous honesty and beautiful singing, So-rim draws Han-gyul back to her time and time again. Along the way the two meet obstacles as So-rim starts her career in the music industry and begins to uncover Han-gyul's lies.

Cast

Main 
 Lee Hyun-woo as Kang Han-gyul/K
A former bass player who quit the famous rock band Crude Play right before they debuted after losing his confidence to perform. He now works behind-the-scenes as the band's talented music composer and producer under the name "K". By chance, Han-gyul meets So-rim and begins to fall for her whilst hiding his true identity.
 Park Soo-young as Yoon So-rim
A nineteen-year-old high school student who possesses a gifted voice. She is scouted by a music CEO and forms the band Mush & Co with her two childhood friends. So-rim's parents died when she was young and she now lives with her grandmother who runs a store called "Happy Fruits and Vegetables". So-rim helps her grandmother by delivering orders to customers, and one day accidentally meets and falls in love at first sight with Han-gyul.
Lee Jung-jin as Choi Jin-hyuk
Director of Sole Music. He has been in love with Yu-na from the beginning and has been waiting for her.
Lee Seo-won as Seo Chan-young
A bass player who replaced Han-gyul in Crude Play. He feels that he has never been fully a part of the group and is resentful of Han-gyul. He later becomes the producer for So-rim's band, and begins to fall for her.
 Hong Seo-young as Chae Yu-na
K's ex-girlfriend. A singer who is criticized by the media for using her body to gain fame. Her feelings for Kang Han-gyul have never gone away even after they broke up.

Supporting

Crude Play band members 
Kim Sung-joo as Yoo Si-hyun (Leader/Vocalist)
Shin Je-min as Lee Yoon (Guitar/Keyboard)
Jang Ki-yong as Ji In-ho (Drummer/Rapper)

People around Han-gyul 
Choi Min-soo as Kang In-woo, a street singer who is Han-gyul's father.

People around So-rim 
Im Ye-jin as Kim Soon-hee, So-rim's grandmother, who owns the "Happy Fruits and Vegetables" store.
Song Kang as Baek Jin-woo, So-rim's childhood friend and the guitarist of the band Mush & Co. He has a long-standing crush on So-rim.
 as Lee Kyu-seon, So-rim's childhood friend and the drummer of the band Mush & Co.
Kim In-kwon as Bong Won-bin, So-rim's homeroom teacher, who helped So-rim and her childhood friends to become famous.
 as Lee Se-jung, So-rim's classmate, who is jealous of So-rim and hates her. She is a die-hard fan of Chan-young.

People around Jin-hyuk 
 Park Ji-young as Yoo Hyun-jung
CEO of Who Entertainment who has been in love with Han-gyul's father since she was young.
 Lee Ha-eun as Yeon Soo-yeon
Employee of Sole Music and likes Si-hyun.

Others 

Lee Yu-joon
Kim Min-seok as Ku Joon-seok
Yang Kyung-won as Kim-eun
Park Seon-hee as Kyu-seon's mother
Kim Seo-young
In Sung-ho
Choi Nam-uk
Choi Na-moo
Jung Yu-an
Min Kyung-jin
Kang Woo-je
Yoon Eun-byul
Yu Ji-hyuk
Choi Ji-an
Yu Ji-yeon
Son Yoon-ju (Voice appearance)
Seo Dan-woo
Jo Young-seon
Lee Young-rae
Kyung Kyu-min
Lee Ho-seok as member of a band
Park Jae-seok as member of a band
Kim Soo-hyun as member of a band
Han Chan-young as member of a band

Special appearances 

 Baek Soo-ryun
 Park Hye-na
 Park Hae-soo
 Kim Young-pil
 Momoland as girl group from survival show "Produce 20" (Ep. 6)
INX, boy group from survival show "Produce 20" (Ep. 6)
 Kim Yong-gun as Chairman of Who Entertainment and Hyun-jung's father (Ep. 7)

Production 

The drama's director Kim Jin-min is known for his hit dramas Time Between Dog and Wolf and Marriage Contract. The production company Bon Factory Worldwide also produced The Greatest Love, You're Beautiful, Master's Sun, and She Was Pretty.

The drama marks the acting debut of Red Velvet's Joy (Park Soo-young).

First script reading took place on January 21, 2017. The second script reading featuring the main cast took place on February 8, 2017 at CJ E&M Center in Sangam-dong, Seoul, South Korea.

Awards and nominations

Original soundtrack

Part 1

Part 2

Part 3

Part 4

Part 5

Part 6

Part 7

Part 8

Part 9

Charted songs

Ratings
 In this table,  represent the lowest ratings and  represent the highest ratings.
 N/A denotes that the rating is not known.

See also 
The Liar and His Lover, 2013 Japanese film

References

External links
  
 
 

TVN (South Korean TV channel) television dramas
2017 South Korean television series debuts
2017 South Korean television series endings
Korean-language television shows
South Korean romantic comedy television series
South Korean musical television series
South Korean teen dramas
Television series by Studio Dragon
Television series by Bon Factory Worldwide